Aither may refer to:

 Aether (classical element), the material supposed to fill the region of the universe above the terrestrial sphere 
 Aether (mythology), the personification of the "upper sky", space and heaven, in Greek mythology

See also
Aether (disambiguation)